D. Veerendra Heggade (born November 25, 1948) is an Indian philanthropist and the hereditary administrator (Dharmadhikari) of the Dharmasthala Temple. He succeeded to the post at the age of 19, on October 24, 1968, the 21st in his line. He administers the temple and its properties, which are held in trust for the benefit of devotees and of Dharma. He is a nominated Member of Parliament in the Rajya Sabha since July 2022. 

He has received multiple awards for his numerous contributions. He was awarded the Karnataka Ratna award for the year 2009, the highest civilian award in Karnataka.

On July 6th 2022, he was nominated as Rajya Sabha member by President Ram Nath Kovind.

Personal life
Heggade was born the eldest son of Dharmadhikari Ratnavarma Heggade and Rathnamma Heggade (née Shetty). He belongs to the Pergade dynasty of Tulu Lineage, the hereditary trustees of the famous Sri Dharmasthala Manjunatha Swamy temple in Dakshina Kannada district of Karnataka. The family are trustees of a Hindu temple, although the family belong to the Digambara Jain community. He has three younger brothers, Harshendra Kumar, Surendra Kumar and Rajendra Kumar, and a sister, Padmalata. He married Hemavathi Heggade in a match arranged by their parents. Veerendra Heggade and Hemavathy Heggadthi are the parents of daughter Shraddha.

As the eldest son, Veerendra Heggade succeeded his father as Dharmadhikari. He is the twenty-first member of the Pergade dynasty to hold the position of Dharmadhikari of the Dharmasthala Temple. As he has no sons, his heir is his younger brother, Harshendra.

Dharmadhikari Veerendra Heggade is a car collector and photography aficionado. His car collection is on display in Dharmasthala.

Works and contributions

Dharmadhikari 
As Dharmadhikari, he has continued the traditions of the institution:

He continued the tradition of the Kshetra to hold annual ‘Sarva Dharma and Sahitya Sammelana’ at Dharmasthala. The 85th Session of the Sammelana was held in 2017.

Heggade has reached beyond his administrative role:

Indian culture

 He is a patron of art and literature.
 He publishes a monthly journal named Manjuvani, besides other publications.
 To propagate Naturopathy, Yoga and Moral Education, 400 teachers of High Schools and Primary Schools train more than 30,000 students every year in Yoga, Moral and Spiritual Education.
 He contributed to the revival of Yakshagana, maintaining a pure traditional approach.
 Manjusha is a museum that displays rare collections of antiques and contemporary rare and valuable artefacts. A Vintage Car Museum attached to this museum has vehicles from many nations.
 4,000 palm-leaf manuscripts are preserved and research on them is conducted by scholars for the "Sri Manjunatheshwara Samskrithi Samshodhana Prathistana".

Social Service

 He has been conducting a Free Mass Marriage every year in Shri Kshethra Dharmasthala since 1972. 10,000 couples had been married under this scheme by April 2004.
 He has constructed marriage halls at Bangalore, Kallahalli, Bhadravathi, Mysore, Shravanabelagola and Bantwal for the benefit of middle- and low-income families.
 He introduced a rural development project in the coastal area of Karnataka, comprising 600 villages and 6 towns. It facilitates:
 Empowerment of 1.35 million families by undertaking:
 Agricultural extension,
 Transfer of technology,
 Women's empowerment,
 Housing,
 Alternate sources of energy,
 Income generating activities,
 Microfinance,
 Education and
 Health.
 He has been promoting solar energy and providing such infrastructure to many villages.
 He established the Rural Development and Self-Employment Training Institute (RUDSETI) in collaboration with Syndicate Bank, Syndicate Agricultural Foundation and Canara Bank to train rural youth for self-employment and volunteers for rural development in 1982. Since then, 20 branches of the RUDSETI have come up across India. Up to June 2004, 1.5 million youth have been trained in these institutes and their employment outcome is 65%.
 He has hosted many national seminars including the one on "Rural India Real India"  to mark Syndicate Bank's diamond jubilee.
 He runs the Annapoorna kitchen at Dharmasthala, which is one of the largest and oldest family-run kitchens in India. The kitchen feeds around 50,000 persons every day. It was featured on the National Geographic TV show, "Mega Kitchens".

Education

 He introduced a post graduate course at Sri Dharmasthala Manjunatheshwara College, Ujire.
 He started SDMIMD College Mysore which evolved into a top Business college in India.
 He started Rathnamanasa, a model hostel with training in Agriculture, Horticulture, Dairying and a concept of future farmers and citizens for high school boys at Ujire.
 He started Sri Siddavana Gurukula, a model hostel for college students at Ujire to inspire students in agriculture, moral education and training in leadership programs.
 He is the President of SDM Educational Society, Ujire, which manages educational institutions from primary to engineering, medical, ayurvedic and management institutes as well as hospitals.

Tuluva culture

 Heggade supported preserving Tuluva culture and heritage.

Awards and honours
 Padma Bhushan Award (2000) for social work and Communal Harmony (India's third-highest civilian award)
 Rajarshi title from President of India, Dr. Shankar Dayal Sharma, in 1993
 The State Government selected Heggade for Karnataka Ratna title for 2009.
 P. V. Narasimha Rao, former Prime Minister of India presented Federation of Indian Chambers of Commerce and Industry award for Rural Development activities in Belthangady Taluk by Shri Kshethra Dharmasthala Rural Development Project (SKDRDP) on May 12, 1995.
 Atal Bihari Vajpayee, former Prime Minister of India presented Federation of Indian Chambers of Commerce and Industry award for Rural Development & Self Employment activities by RUDSET Institute on November 20, 1999.
 "Vatika Varshada Kannadiga – 2004" by ETV Kannada at Hassan on November 20, 2004
 Padma Vibhushan (2015) by the Government of India for social work
 Zee Kannada Hemmeya Kannadiga 2019 Hemmeya Jeevamaana Sadhakaru by Zee Kannada in 2019
 Sri Bhagavan Mahaveera Peace Award by Government of Karnataka

References

External links
 Official website

 http://www.newskarnataka.com/mangalore/dr-veerendra-heggade-to-share-stage-with-pm-on-world-yoga-day

Living people
Indian philanthropists
Recipients of the Padma Bhushan in social work
20th-century Indian Jains
People from Dakshina Kannada district
Mangaloreans
Tulu people
1948 births
Recipients of the Karnataka Ratna
Recipients of the Padma Vibhushan in social work
Heggade family
21st-century Indian Jains
Social workers
Social workers from Karnataka
Nominated members of the Rajya Sabha